Phasia aldrichii is a tachinid fly found throughout most of North America.

Description
Body length 3-5mm.

References

Phasiinae
Diptera of North America
Insects described in 1891
Taxa named by Charles Henry Tyler Townsend